Dejan Pavličić (born 19 September 1979) is a retired Croatian football midfielder.

References

1979 births
Living people
Sportspeople from Vinkovci
Association football midfielders
Croatian footballers
HNK Cibalia players
NK Vinogradar players
HNK Suhopolje players
NK Imotski players
Croatian Football League players
First Football League (Croatia) players